Osoblaha is a municipality and village in Bruntál District in the Moravian-Silesian Region of the Czech Republic. It has about 1,100 inhabitants.

Administrative parts
Osoblaha is made up of one administrative part.

Etymology
The Czech name of the village came from Latin names of two local watercourses, Osoblaha and Planá, in Latin Ossa and Plavia.

The German name "Hotzenplotz" was derived from German Holzen Platz (literally "wooden place") and has its origin in oak forests in the area. It served the German writer Otfried Preußler for naming his famous children's book character of "The Robber Hotzenplotz".

Geography
Osoblaha lies in the Osoblažsko microregion on the border with Poland. It is located in the Opava Hilly Land within the Silesian Lowlands. The Osoblaha River flows through the municipality.

In the territory of Osoblaha lies the former village of Studnice, which is abandoned since 1971.

History
The first written mention of Osoblaha is from 1233. The village gained  town rights in 1251, which opened the way for its subsequent economic development.

The Jewish population in Osoblaha was first documented in the 14th century. During the 19th century, they made up 30% of the town's population. However, they left the town before World War II.

According to the Austrian census of 1910, the town had 2,853 inhabitants, almost all of whom declared themselves to be German-speaking, though this included most Yiddish-speaking Jews, who were not allowed to enter Yiddish as a separate language. The main religious groups were Roman Catholics with 2,779 (97.4%), followed by Jews with 58 (2%).

From 1938 to 1945, Osoblaha was annexed by Nazi Germany and administered as a part of Reichsgau Sudetenland. Although Osoblaha was the first town in the Czech lands to be liberated, in March 1945, the bitter fighting caused the destruction of 90% of all buildings. The German population was expelled and the town became significantly depopulated. In 1960, the municipality lost its town status.

Demographics

Transport

Osoblaha is the final stop of the narrow-gauge Třemešná ve Slezsku – Osoblaha Railway.

Sights

The most important monument is the Jewish cemetery, which is one of the most valuable in the Czech Republic. It was probably founded at the end of the 14th century and 313 tombstones have been preserved, the oldest of them dates from 1694.

Other monuments are the Baroque cemetery Church of Saint Nicholas built in 1756–1766, and a tiny remnant of the medieval town walls.

The narrow-gauge railway serves not only for transport but also as a tourist attraction. Steam trains run on weekends during the tourist season.

Notable people
Berthold Englisch (1851–1897), Austrian chess master

Twin towns – sister cities

Osoblaha is twinned with:
 Izbicko, Poland

References

External links

Shtetls
Villages in Bruntál District